She is the eighth studio album released by Australian singer Wendy Matthews in November 2008. She is a collection of personal favourite songs by women who have inspired her over the years, songs by Bonnie Raitt, Aretha Franklin, Chrissie Hynde, Joni Mitchell and Buffy Sainte-Marie. This is her first independent album on her own "Barking Bear Records" label.

Review

Track listing
 Fallen Angels – 3:48 (Buffy Sainte-Marie from Coincidence and Likely Stories
 Cherokee Louise – 4:23 (Joni Mitchell from Night Ride Home)
 Four Strong Winds – 4:02 (Ian and Sylvia, Four Strong Winds)
 She – 3:38 (Emmylou Harris from Luxury Liner)
 'Til You Come Back To Me – 3:02 (Aretha Franklin, Until You Come Back to Me)
 Kid – 3:57 (The Pretenders, from Pretenders (album))
 Silverblue – 3:03 (Linda Ronstadt from Prisoner in Disguise)
 Fruits Of My Labour – 3:41 (Lucinda Williams from World Without Tears)
 Faithless Love – 3:28 (Linda Ronstadt from Heart Like a Wheel)
 99 Pounds – 2:47 (Ann Peebles from Straight from the Heart)
 Life Is A Red Wagon – 4:17 (Jane Siberry from Bound by the Beauty)
 Home – 3:28 (Bonnie Raitt from Sweet Forgiveness)

References

2008 albums
Wendy Matthews albums